A Eunicycle is a computer-controlled, partially self-balancing, motorized unicycle invented by Trevor Blackwell. It uses a computer control system similar to the one used by the Segway HT that servos its wheel to balance itself by keeping the contact point of the wheel below the center of mass of the vehicle in the front-to-back direction. To balance from side to side, the rider must rotate the vehicle the same way a unicyclist does, enabling the balancing servo to balance in the new direction.

The Eunicycle is based on an open design; the engineering drawings and control software source code are available from the website.

See also
 Bicycle and motorcycle dynamics
 Self-balancing unicycle
 Uno dicycle
 Wheel in B.C. (comic strip)
  B.C.'s_Quest_for_Tires

External links
http://tlb.org/#eunicycle

Cycle types
Unicycling
Free software
Open hardware vehicles